Eulepidotis albidus is a moth of the family Erebidae first described by Émile Blanchard in 1852. It is found in the Neotropical realm, including Chile.

References

Moths described in 1852
albidus